Senator Justice may refer to:

Charlie Justice (politician) (born 1968), Florida State Senate
Robert Justice (1809–1889), Ohio State Senate
Ron Justice (fl. 2000s–2010s), Oklahoma State Senate

See also
Jolie Justus (born 1971), Missouri State Senate